Balmoral is a suburb of the City of Lake Macquarie in New South Wales, Australia, and is located on the western shore of Lake Macquarie between the towns of Toronto and Morisset.

It has a boat ramp providing access to Secret Bay and Eraring Bay on Lake Macquarie.

See also
 2013 New South Wales bushfires

References

External links
 History of Balmoral (Lake Macquarie City Library)

Suburbs of Lake Macquarie